Zona Latina is a private owned cable TV channel of Chile. It airs Spanish language music videos as well as Talk Shows. Its sister station is Via X which airs English language music videos. It is owned by 'Television Interactiva and is available on cable. On April 9, 2012, the channel premiered his first program called Sabores ¿Qué cocinamos hoy?  (English: Flavors: What are we cooking today?) Other shows are "Sin Dios Ni Late", hosted by journalist Carola Brethauer and "No eres tú, soy yo", hosted by Javiera Suárez.

See also
 List of Chilean television channels

References

External links
 Official Site 

Television networks in Chile
Television stations in Chile
Music television channels
Spanish-language television stations
Television channels and stations established in 1997
Companies based in Santiago
Music organisations based in Chile